Richard Mulenga (born August 10th, 1985) is a Zambian R&B, reggae and Dancehall artist.

Career
In 2010, T-Sean established himself as a reggae and dancehall artist. His first songs were "Wonder Why", which featured B1, and "Show Me Ya Swag" in which featured Macky 2, Cactus and T-Bwoy.
This was the beginning of his musical collaborations with the dancehall artist T-Bwoy.
He wrote and performed songs that received major radio airplay and in 2011, he was nominated for a Born and Bred Award, for his song "Sinizaibala".

Discography

Studio albums

Singles

Awards and nominations

References

Living people
21st-century Zambian male singers
1985 births